This is a list of ambassadors to Czech Republic. Note that some ambassadors are responsible for more than one country while others are directly accredited to Prague.

Current ambassadors to Czech Republic

References 

Foreign Missions to the Czech Republic: Section A - C

  Foreign Missions to the Czech Republic: Section D - F

  Foreign Missions to the Czech Republic: Section G - I

  Foreign Missions to the Czech Republic: Section J - L

  Foreign Missions to the Czech Republic: Section M - O

  Foreign Missions to the Czech Republic: Section P - R

  Foreign Missions to the Czech Republic: Section S - U

  Foreign Missions to the Czech Republic: Section V - Z

Ministry of Foreign Affairs of the Czech Republic Diplomatic Protocol. Diplomatic List

Czech Republic